Douglas Township is a township in Shelby County, Iowa. There are 430 people and 11.7 people per square mile in Douglas Township. The total area is 36.7 square miles.

References

Townships in Shelby County, Iowa
Townships in Iowa